Sfouf is a Lebanese almond-semolina cake consumed on birthdays, family reunions, and religious holidays. It is made from semolina flour flavored with turmeric, sugar, sesame paste, aniseed, and pine nuts, and raised with baking powder.

References

Arab cuisine
Lebanese cuisine
Cakes